Afazalpur Dhobghati
Saidpur Village is a village in Bihar, India.

Geography
Afazalpur Dhobghati
Saidpur Village is located at

Village profile
State :Bihar
District :vaishali district
Sub-district:Hajipur

Area details
Area of village (in hectares) :100 
Number of households :341

population

Total population=2,224
Total male population=1150
Total female  population=1,074
Scheduled castes population (total) =703
Scheduled castes male =373
Scheduled castes Females=330

Approach to villages
Nearest town =Hajipur
Distance from the nearest town (in km) =8 km

Land use Two decimal in hectares

Total irrigated area =58.16
other=58.16
Unirrigated area=20.26
Culturable waste (including gauchar and groves) =4.86
Area not available for cultivation =17.06

References 

Villages in Vaishali district
Hajipur